Cesare Beltrami (born 27 December 1942) is an Italian sprint canoer. He competed at the 1964 and 1968 Summer Olympics and finished sixth twice in 1964: in the K-2 1000 m and K-4 1000 m events.

References

1942 births
Canoeists at the 1964 Summer Olympics
Canoeists at the 1968 Summer Olympics
Italian male canoeists
Living people
Olympic canoeists of Italy